Eupithecia cuculliaria is a moth in the  family Geometridae. It is found in Italy, Croatia, Slovenia, Albania, Bosnia and Herzegovina, North Macedonia, Greece, Bulgaria, Turkey and the Near East.

The wingspan is 15–17 mm.

References

Moths described in 1901
cuculliaria
Moths of Europe
Moths of Asia